Chrysanthemums, sometimes called mums or chrysanths, are flowering plants of the genus Chrysanthemum in the family Asteraceae. They are native to East Asia and northeastern Europe. Most species originate from East Asia and the center of diversity is in China. Countless horticultural varieties and cultivars exist.

Description 

The genus Chrysanthemum are perennial herbaceous flowering plants, sometimes subshrubs. The leaves are alternate, divided into leaflets and may be pinnatisect, lobed, or serrate (toothed) but rarely entire; they are connected to stalks with hairy bases.

The compound inflorescence is an array of several flower heads, or sometimes a solitary head. The head has a base covered in layers of phyllaries. The simple row of ray florets is white, yellow, or red. The disc florets are yellow. Pollen grains are approximately 34 microns.

The fruit is a ribbed achene.

Etymology 
The name "chrysanthemum" is derived from the  chrysos (gold) and  anthemon (flower).

Taxonomy 
The genus Chrysanthemum was first formally described by Linnaeus in 1753, with 14 species, and hence bears his name (L.) as the botanical authority. The genus once included more species, but was split several decades ago into several genera, putting the economically important florist's chrysanthemums in the genus Dendranthema. The naming of these genera has been contentious, but a ruling of the International Botanical Congress in 1999 changed the defining species of the genus to Chrysanthemum indicum, restoring the florist's chrysanthemums to the genus Chrysanthemum.

Genera now separated from Chrysanthemum include Argyranthemum, Glebionis, Leucanthemopsis, Leucanthemum, Rhodanthemum, and Tanacetum.

Species 
, Plants of the World Online accepted the following species:

 Chrysanthemum aphrodite Kitam.
 Chrysanthemum arcticum L.
 Chrysanthemum argyrophyllum Ling
 Chrysanthemum arisanense Hayata
 Chrysanthemum chalchingolicum Grubov
 Chrysanthemum chanetii H.Lév.
 Chrysanthemum crassum (Kitam.) Kitam.
 Chrysanthemum cuneifolium Kitam.
 Chrysanthemum daucifolium Pers.
 Chrysanthemum dichrum (C.Shih) H.Ohashi & Yonek.
 Chrysanthemum foliaceum (G.F.Peng, C.Shih & S.Q.Zhang) J.M.Wang & Y.T.Hou
 Chrysanthemum glabriusculum (W.W.Sm.) Hand.-Mazz.
 Chrysanthemum horaimontanum Masam.
 Chrysanthemum hypargyreum Diels
 Chrysanthemum indicum L.
 Chrysanthemum integrifolium Richardson
 Chrysanthemum japonense (Makino) Nakai
 Chrysanthemum × konoanum Makino
 Chrysanthemum lavandulifolium Makino
 Chrysanthemum leucanthum (Makino) Makino
 Chrysanthemum longibracteatum (C.Shih, G.F.Peng & S.Y.Jin) J.M.Wang & Y.T.Hou
 Chrysanthemum maximoviczii Kom.
 Chrysanthemum miyatojimense Kitam.
 Chrysanthemum × morifolium (Ramat.) Hemsl.
 Chrysanthemum morii Hayata
 Chrysanthemum naktongense Nakai
 Chrysanthemum ogawae Kitam.
 Chrysanthemum okiense Kitam.
 Chrysanthemum oreastrum Hance
 Chrysanthemum ornatum Hemsl.
 Chrysanthemum parvifolium C.C.Chang
 Chrysanthemum potentilloides Hand.-Mazz.
 Chrysanthemum rhombifolium (Y.Ling & C.Shih) H.Ohashi & Yonek.
 Chrysanthemum × rubellum Sealy
 Chrysanthemum × shimotomaii Makino
 Chrysanthemum sinuatum Ledeb.
 Chrysanthemum vestitum (Hemsl.) Kitam.
 Chrysanthemum yantaiense M.Sun & J.T.Chen
 Chrysanthemum yoshinaganthum Makino
 Chrysanthemum zawadskii Herbich
 Chrysanthemum zhuozishanense L.Q.Zhao & Jie Yang

Former species include:
 Chrysanthemum carinatum = Ismelia carinata
 Chrysanthemum cinerariifolium = Tanacetum cinerariifolium
 Chrysanthemum coccineum = Tanacetum coccineum
 Chrysanthemum coronarium = Glebionis coronaria
 Chrysanthemum frutescens = Argyranthemum frutescens
 Chrysanthemum maximum = Leucanthemum maximum
 Chrysanthemum pacificum = Ajania pacifica
 Chrysanthemum segetum = Glebionis segetum

Ecology 

Chrysanthemums start blooming in early autumn. This is also known as the favorite flower for the month of November.

History 
Chrysanthemums were first cultivated in China as a flowering herb as far back as the 15th century BC. Over 500 cultivars had been recorded by 1630. By 2014 it was estimated that there were over 20,000 cultivars in the world and about 7,000 cultivars in China. The plant is renowned as one of the Four Gentlemen in Chinese and East Asian Art. The plant is particularly significant during the Double Ninth Festival.

Chrysanthemum cultivation began in Japan during the Nara and Heian periods (early 8th to late 12th centuries), and gained popularity in the Edo period (early 17th to late 19th century). Many flower shapes, colours, and varieties were created. The way the flowers were grown and shaped also developed, and chrysanthemum culture flourished. Various cultivars of chrysanthemums created in the Edo period were characterized by a remarkable variety of flower shapes, and were exported to China from the end of the Edo period, changing the way Chinese chrysanthemum cultivars were grown and their popularity. In addition, from the Meiji period (late 19th to early 20th century), many cultivars with flowers over 20 cm (7.87 in) in diameter, called the Ogiku (lit., great chrysanthemum) style were created, which influenced the subsequent trend of chrysanthemums. The Imperial Seal of Japan is a chrysanthemum and the institution of the monarchy is also called the Chrysanthemum Throne. A number of festivals and shows take place throughout Japan in autumn when the flowers bloom.  is one of the five ancient sacred festivals. It is celebrated on the 9th day of the 9th month. It was started in 910, when the imperial court held its first chrysanthemum show.

Chrysanthemums entered American horticulture in 1798 when Colonel John Stevens imported a cultivated variety known as 'Dark Purple' from England. The introduction was part of an effort to grow attractions within Elysian Fields in Hoboken, New Jersey.

Economic uses

Ornamental uses 

Modern cultivated chrysanthemums are showier than their wild relatives. Many horticultural specimens have been bred to bear many rows of ray florets in a great variety of colors. The flower heads occur in various forms, and can be daisy-like or decorative, like pompons or buttons. This genus contains many hybrids and thousands of cultivars developed for horticultural purposes. In addition to the traditional yellow, other colors are available, such as white, purple, and red. The most important hybrid is Chrysanthemum × morifolium (syn. C. × grandiflorum), derived primarily from C. indicum, but also involving other species.

Over 140 cultivars of chrysanthemum have gained the Royal Horticultural Society's Award of Garden Merit (confirmed 2017).

Chrysanthemums are divided into two basic groups, garden hardy and exhibition. Garden hardy chrysanthemums are perennials capable of wintering in most northern latitudes. Exhibition varieties are not usually as sturdy. Garden hardy varieties are defined by their ability to produce an abundance of small blooms with little if any mechanical assistance, such as staking, and withstanding wind and rain. Exhibition varieties, though, require staking, overwintering in a relatively dry, cool environment, and sometimes the addition of night lights.

The exhibition varieties can be used to create many amazing plant forms, such as large disbudded blooms, spray forms, and many artistically trained forms, such as thousand-bloom, standard (trees), fans, hanging baskets, topiary, bonsai, and cascades.

Chrysanthemum blooms are divided into 13 different bloom forms by the US National Chrysanthemum Society, Inc., which is in keeping with the international classification system. The bloom forms are defined by the way in which the ray and disk florets are arranged. Chrysanthemum blooms are composed of many individual flowers (florets), each one capable of producing a seed. The disk florets are in the center of the bloom head, and the ray florets are on the perimeter. The ray florets are considered imperfect flowers, as they only possess the female reproductive organs, while the disk florets are considered perfect flowers, as they possess both male and female reproductive organs.

Irregular incurves are bred to produce a giant head called an ogiku. The disk florets are concealed in layers of curving ray florets that hang down to create a 'skirt'. Regular incurves are similar, but usually with smaller blooms and a dense, globular form. Intermediate incurve blooms may have broader florets and a less densely flowered head.

In the reflex form, the disk florets are concealed and the ray florets reflex outwards to create a mop-like appearance. The decorative form is similar to reflex blooms, but the ray florets usually do not radiate at more than a 90° angle to the stem.

The pompon form is fully double, of small size, and very globular in form. Single and semidouble blooms have exposed disk florets and one to seven rows of ray florets. In the anemone form, the disk florets are prominent, often raised and overshadowing the ray florets. The spoon-form disk florets are visible and the long, tubular ray florets are spatulate. In the spider form, the disk florets are concealed, and the ray florets are tube-like with hooked or barbed ends, hanging loosely around the stem. In the brush and thistle variety, the disk florets may be visible.

In Japan, a form of bonsai chrysanthemum was developed over the centuries. The cultivated flower has a lifespan of about 5 years and can be kept in miniature size. Another method is to use pieces of dead wood and the flower grows over the back along the wood to give the illusion from the front that the miniature tree blooms.

Culinary uses 
Yellow or white chrysanthemum flowers of the species C. morifolium are boiled to make a tea in some parts of East Asia. The resulting beverage is known simply as chrysanthemum tea (菊 花 茶, pinyin: júhuā chá, in Chinese). In Korea, a rice wine flavored with chrysanthemum flowers is called gukhwaju (국화주).

Chrysanthemum leaves are steamed or boiled and used as greens, especially in Chinese cuisine. The flowers may be added to dishes such as mixian in broth, or thick snakemeat soup (蛇羹) to enhance the aroma. They are commonly used in hot pot and stir fries. Japanese cuisine sashimi uses small chrysanthemums as garnish.

Insecticidal uses 
Pyrethrum (Chrysanthemum [or Tanacetum] cinerariaefolium) is economically important as a natural source of insecticide. The flowers are pulverized, and the active components, called pyrethrins, which occur in the achenes, are extracted and sold in the form of an oleoresin. This is applied as a suspension in water or oil, or as a powder. Pyrethrins attack the nervous systems of all insects, and inhibit female mosquitoes from biting. In sublethal doses, they have an insect-repellent effect. They are harmful to fish, but are far less toxic to mammals and birds than many synthetic insecticides. They are not persistent, being biodegradable, and also decompose easily on exposure to light. Pyrethroids such as permethrin are synthetic insecticides based on natural pyrethrum. Despite this, chrysanthemum leaves are still a major host for destructive pests, such as leafminer flies including L. trifolii.

Persian powder is an example of industrial product of chrysanthemum insecticide.

Environmental uses 
Chrysanthemum plants have been shown to reduce indoor air pollution by the NASA Clean Air Study.

Cultural significance and symbolism 
In some European countries (e.g., France, Belgium, Italy, Spain, Poland, Hungary, Croatia), incurve chrysanthemums symbolize death and are used only for funerals or on graves, while other types carry no such symbolism; similarly, in China, Japan, and Korea of East Asia, white chrysanthemums symbolize adversity, lamentation, and/or grief. In some other countries, they represent honesty. In the United States, the flower is usually regarded as positive and cheerful, with New Orleans as a notable exception.

In the Victorian language of flowers, the chrysanthemum had several meanings. The Chinese chrysanthemum meant cheerfulness, whereas the red chrysanthemum stood for "I Love", while the yellow chrysanthemum symbolized slighted love. The chrysanthemum is also the flower of November.

East Asia

China 

 The chrysanthemum is the city flower of Beijing and Kaifeng. The tradition of cultivating different varieties of chrysanthemums stretches back 1600 years, and the scale reached a phenomenal level during the Song dynasty until its loss to the Jürchens in 1126. The city has held the Kaifeng Chrysanthemum Cultural Festival since 1983 (renamed China Kaifeng Chrysanthemum Cultural Festival in 1994). The event is the largest chrysanthemum festival in China; it has been a yearly feature since, taking place between 18 October and 18 November every year.
 The chrysanthemum is one of the "Four Gentlemen" of China (the others being the plum blossom, the orchid, and bamboo). The chrysanthemum is said to have been favored by Tao Qian, an influential Chinese poet, and is symbolic of nobility. It is also one of the four symbolic seasonal flowers.
 A chrysanthemum festival is held each year in Tongxiang, near Hangzhou, China.
 Chrysanthemums are the topic in hundreds of poems of China.
 The "golden flower" referred to in the 2006 movie Curse of the Golden Flower is a chrysanthemum.
 "Chrysanthemum Gate" (jú huā mén ), often abbreviated as Chrysanthemum (菊花), is taboo slang meaning "anus" (with sexual connotations).
 An ancient Chinese city (Xiaolan Town of Zhongshan City) was named Ju-Xian, meaning "chrysanthemum city".
 The plant is particularly significant during the Chinese Double Ninth Festival.
 In Chinese culture, the chrysanthemum is a symbol of autumn and the flower of the ninth moon. People even drank chrysanthemum wine on the ninth day of the ninth lunar month to prolong their lives during the Han dynasty. It is a symbol of longevity because of its health-giving properties. Because of all of this, the flower was often worn on funeral attire.
 Pharmacopoeia of the People's Republic of China listed two kinds of chrysanthemum for medical use, Yejuhua and Juhua. Historically Yejuhua is said to treat carbuncle, furuncle, conjunctivitis, headache, and vertigo. Juhua is said to treat cold, headache, vertigo, and conjunctivitis.

Japan 

Chrysanthemums first arrived in Japan by way of China in the 5th century. The chrysanthemum has been used as a theme of waka (Japanese traditional poetry) since around the 10th century in the Heian period, and Kokin Wakashū is the most famous of them. In the 12th century, during the Kamakura period, when the Retired Emperor Go-Toba adopted it as the mon (family crest) of the Imperial family, it became a flower that symbolized autumn in Japan. During the Edo period from the 17th century to the 19th century, due to the development of economy and culture, the cultivation of chrysanthemums, cherry blossoms, Japanese iris, morning glory, etc. became popular, many cultivars were created and many chrysanthemum exhibitions were held. From the Meiji period in the latter half of the 19th century, due to the growing importance of the chrysanthemum, which symbolized the Imperial family, the creation of ogiku style cultivars with a diameter of 20 cm or more became popular.

In the present day, each autumn there are chrysanthemum exhibitions at the Shinjuku Gyo-en, Meiji Shrine and Yasukuni Shrine in Tokyo. The Yasukuni Shrine, formerly a state-endowed shrine (官国弊社, kankokuheisha) has adopted the chrysanthemum crest. Culinary-grade chrysanthemums are used to decorate food, and they remain a common motif for traditional Japanese arts like porcelain, lacquerware and kimono.

Chrysanthemum growing is still practised actively as a hobby by many Japanese people who enter prize plants in contests. Chrysanthemum "dolls", often depicting fictional characters from both traditional sources like kabuki and contemporary sources like Disney, are displayed throughout the fall months, and the city of Nihonmatsu hosts the "Nihonmatsu Chrysanthemum Dolls Exhibition" every autumn in historical ruin of Nihonmatsu Castle. They are also grown into chrysanthemum bonsai forms.
 In Japan, the chrysanthemum is a symbol of the Emperor and the Imperial family. In particular, a "chrysanthemum crest" (菊花紋章, kikukamonshō or kikkamonshō), i.e. a mon of chrysanthemum blossom design, indicates a link to the Emperor; there are more than 150 patterns of this design. Notable uses of and reference to the Imperial chrysanthemum include:
 The Imperial Seal of Japan is used by members of the Japanese imperial family. In 1869, a two-layered, 16-petal design was designated as the symbol of the emperor. Princes used a simpler, single-layer pattern.
 The Chrysanthemum Throne is the name given to the position of Japanese Emperor and the throne.
 The Supreme Order of the Chrysanthemum is a Japanese honor awarded by the emperor on the advice of the Japanese government.
 In imperial Japan, small arms were required to be stamped with the imperial chrysanthemum, as they were considered the personal property of the emperor.
 The Nagoya Castle Chrysanthemum Competition started after the end of the Pacific War. The event at the castle has become a tradition for the city. With three categories, it is one of the largest events of its kind in the region by both scale and content. The first category is the exhibition of cultivated flowers. The second category is for bonsai flowers, which are combined with dead pieces of wood to give the illusion of miniature trees. The third category is the creation of miniature landscapes.

Korea 
Korea has a number of flower shows that exhibit the chrysanthemum, such as the Masan Gagopa Chrysanthemum Festival.

West Asia

Iran 
In Iran, chrysanthemums are associated with the Zoroastrian spiritual being Ashi Vanghuhi (lit. 'good blessings, rewards'), a female Yazad (angel) presiding over blessings.

Israel 
In 2017, Israel named a new fast-growing Chrysanthemum flower after Narendra Modi, the Prime Minister of India, in a special gesture to mark the first visit of an Indian prime minister to the Jewish nation.

Oceania

Australia 
In Australia, on Mother's Day, which falls in May when the flower is in season, people traditionally wear a white chrysanthemum, or a similar white flower to honour their mothers. Chrysanthemums are often given as Mother's Day presents.

North America

United States 
 On 5 and 6 November 1883, in Philadelphia, the Pennsylvania Horticultural Society (PHS), at the request of the Florists and Growers Society, held its first Chrysanthemum Show in Horticultural Hall. This would be the first of several chrysanthemum events presented by PHS to the public.
 The founding of the chrysanthemum industry dates back to 1884, when the Enomoto brothers of Redwood City, California grew the first chrysanthemums cultivated in America.
 In 1913, Sadakasu Enomoto (of San Mateo County) astounded the flower world by successfully shipping a carload of Turner chrysanthemums to New Orleans for the All Saints Day Celebration.
 The chrysanthemum was recognized as the official flower of the city of Chicago by Mayor Richard J. Daley in 1966.
 The chrysanthemum is the official flower of the city of Salinas, California.
 The chrysanthemum is the official flower of several fraternities and sororities including Chi Phi, Phi Kappa Sigma, Phi Mu Alpha Sinfonia, Lambda Kappa Sigma, Sigma Alpha and Triangle Fraternity.

Europe

Italy 
Italian composer Giacomo Puccini wrote Crisantemi (1890), a movement for string quartet, in memory of his friend Amedeo di Savoia Duca d'Aosta. In Italy (and other European countries) the chrysanthemum is the flower that people traditionally bring to their deceased loved ones at the cemetery and is generally associated with mourning. A probable reason for this is the fact that the plant flowers between the end of October and the beginning of November, coinciding with the Day of the Dead (2 November).

Poland 
Chrysanthemums are placed on graves to honor the dead during All Saints' Day and All Souls' Day in Poland.

United Kingdom 
The UK National Collection of hardy chrysanthemums is at Hill Close Gardens near Warwick.

Gallery

See also 
 List of Lepidoptera that feed on chrysanthemums
 Photoperiodism

References

Bibliography 

Books
 
 
 
 
  
 , see also Species Plantarum 

Articles

External links 
 
 
 Germplasm Resources Information Network: Chrysanthemum
 About.com page on Chrysanthemums
 United States National Chrysanthemum Society website
 ICBN: List of conserved genera (scroll down for Chrysanthemum)
 Auburn University (College of Agriculture) web page on Chrysanthemums
 University of California web page on aphid management

 
Asteraceae genera
Garden plants
Leaf vegetables
Medicinal plants
National symbols of Japan
Plants used in bonsai